Meerkerk Rhododendron Gardens (53 acres) are nonprofit gardens located at 3531 Meerkerk Lane, Greenbank, Washington. They are open daily; admission is $5.00

Ann Meerkerk left the gardens to the Seattle Rhododendron Society in 1979.

Today the garden features more than 1,500 varieties of rhododendron species and hybrids.

See also
 List of botanical gardens in the United States

External links 
 Meerkerk Rhododendron Gardens

Botanical gardens in Washington (state)
Parks in Island County, Washington